The MIST satellite (MIniature STudent Satellite) is a satellite currently under development at the KTH Royal Institute of Technology in Stockholm, Sweden. 

The satellite is a 3U CubeSat, primarily built by students working in small teams. The project was defined in 2014, and the work started on January 28, 2015. The project is led by Sven Grahn, an experienced satellite project manager.

Seven technical and scientific experiments are included in the KTH student satellite MIST (MIniature STudent satellite). The experiments have been proposed from inside KTH, from two Swedish companies and from the Swedish Institute of Space Physics in Kiruna.

References 

Proposed satellites